Acoustiblok, a registered trademark product of Acoustiblok Inc, is manufactured in the United states. It is a sound attenuation material that was introduced in 1999.  It is implemented in new construction or remodeling projects. It is also designed for application beneath the drywall and other finishing materials.

Physical properties

Acoustiblok is a mass-loaded vinyl, sound isolation product. It is an extremely dense but very flexible material that comes in two sizes; 16oz. and 32oz. 

 Sixteen ounce Acoustiblok is 1/8" thick, and weighs 1 lb/ft2.
 Thirty-two ounce Acoustiblok is 1/4" thick, and weighs 2 lb/ft2.
 Barium Free
 Color: Black
 High UV Resistance
 No Fungal or Algal Growth

Performance data

The ability of a partition to block transmission of airborne sound is typically described by a single number rating of the Sound Transmission Class (STC).  

 Sixteen ounce Acoustiblok material has an STC of 26.
 Thirty-two ounce Acoustiblok material has an STC of 32.
 Adding one layer of Acoustiblok to a standard metal stud gypsum board interior wall, increases its STC to 53.
 Double steel stud partition walls, faced with single layers of drywall and containing fiberglass insulation and Acoustiblok, can achieve an STC of 66.

STC is calculated using a range of frequencies similar to the human voice; attenuation in higher and lower ranges should be estimated from the Sound Transmission Loss graphs provided with standard STC reports. 

Test procedures and the formula for calculation of STC values are defined in ASTM Standards E90-02 and E413-87.

Construction applications

New Construction, Remodel/Renovation   

Acoustiblok material is typically installed in partition walls and floor/ceiling assemblies when they are stripped to the studs.

Classification

Acoustiblok is qualified for use in commercial and institutional construction by its UL Classification file, found under Fire Tests of Building Construction and Materials.  This Classification includes use in wall designs of the U300, U400, and V400 series, and floor-ceiling constructions of the L500 series, as specified in ANSI/UL 263 Fire Resistance Ratings. Ratings of 1 and 2 hours can be obtained, depending on specific partition design.

References

Noise reduction